The Juventus F.C. ultras are the organized fans of Italian football club Juventus, from Turin.

History
The first organized groups of Juventus Football Club supporters came about in the middle of the 1970s. The first two groups were called Venceremos and Autonomia Bianconera and both were on the left side in politics. In 1976 the first two Ultras groups were founded, Fossa dei Campioni and Panthers.

One year later, the Gruppo Storico Fighters was founded by Beppe Rossi, who was an important figure among the Juventus supporters.

In the first years of the 1980s, other supporter groups were created: Gioventù Bianconera, Area Bianconera and Indians were among them. Two extreme ultras groups were also founded during this period; the Viking and Nucleo Armato Bianconero (N.A.B.).  In 1987 the Gruppo Storico Fighters was dissolved as consequence of conflicts between Juve and Fiorentina fans in Florence. A lot of old Fighters members together with members from other groups -as Indians and Gioventù Bianconera- decided to form a new group called Arancia Meccanica, inspired by the popular Stanley Kubrick film, but a short time later they have changed the name to Drughi. Drughi became the most important supporter group and had about 10,000 members between 1988 and 1996.

In 1993 some of the Drughi members who were old members of Fighters group decided to form this group again. In the next four years they fought with Drughi, who then later became the leading group in La Curva Scirea  of the Stadio Delle Alpi and the result was that Drughi will hang their banner in the middle of La Curva Scirea while Fighters had to put theirs on right of them.

In 1997 leader groups Fighters and Drughi together with other groups in La Curva Scirea  decided to get together under the name Black And White Fighters Gruppo Storico 1977.

In this period another big supporter group, Irriducibili Vallette, gained massive influence in the Curva Nord of the stadium. The group was created in 1990 by a group from the Turin neighbourhood Vallette. This group was placed in the Curva Nord at the other end of the stadium from where Fighters are placed. In the beginning the group were very organized and in 1998 they replaced Viking and took over the leadership in the Curva Nord, but after many problems Irriducibili do not exist any more.

At the present, the Curva Sud of the Juventus Stadium is the main area where the Old Lady organized supporters attends their home matches. They are composed by current supporters groups as Drughi -the leading group in La Curva Sud -, Viking Juve, Arditi, Nucleo 1985, 06 Clan, Noi Soli, Gruppo Marche 1993 (also knowns as GM), Bruxelles Bianconera (composed by supporters from Belgium and Luxembourg), Gruppo Homer (also knowns as GH), Assiduo Sostegno and Bravi Ragazzi (composed by former Irriducibili members). The Fighters group, the leading Juventus group located in La Curva Nord at the same stadium, have changed his name to Tradizione Bianconera in 2005.

See also

 Football culture
 Major football rivalries
 Tifo
 Ultras groups
 Hooliganism
 Football chants

Footnotes and references

https://archive.today/20140914204019/http://www.ahdef.com/2014/09/ahdef-Juventus-vs-Udinese.html

Bibliography

External links

 Drughi 
 Tradizione Bianconera 
 Nucleo 1985 
 Arditi: La Razza 
 Bruxelles Bianconera 

 Viking Juve 
 Noi Soli 
 Gruppo Marche 1993 
 Intoccabili Cutrofiano 

Ultras
Association football culture
Ultras groups
Italian football supporters' associations